List of events in the year 2011 in Honduras.

Incumbents 
 President – Porfirio Lobo
 National congress president – Juan Orlando Hernández
 Supreme Court president – Jorge Alberto Rivera Avilés

Events
 February 3: At least 18 people died after a bus accident near Tegucigalpa. 
 February 14: Central American Airways Flight 731 crashes outside Tegucigalpa, all the 14 passengers and crew are killed.
 March 8: General teacher's strike during five weeks. The government declared it as "illegal".
 April 9: Honduran president Porfirio Lobo, Colombian president Juan Manuel Santos and Venezuelan president Hugo Chavez met in Cartagena de Indias to accord the return of ousted Honduran president Manuel Zelaya.
 May 28: Ousted and exiled ex-president Manuel Zelaya returns to Honduras after the meeting of Honduras', Colombia's and Venezuela's presidents.
 August 2: Second major teacher's strike.
 August 20: Tropical Storm Harvey passes near Atlantic's coast.
 September 15: Honduras' independence day celebrations.
 October 20: Heavy storms and floods causes at least 50 deaths in the south of Honduras, specially in the Choluteca Department.

References 

 
Years of the 21st century in Honduras
Honduras
Honduras
2010s in Honduras